Qoroqchi (also Romanized as Qoroqchī) is a village in, and the capital of, Ajorluy-ye Gharbi Rural District of Nokhtalu District of Baruq County, West Azerbaijan province, Iran. At the 2006 National Census, its population was 45 in 10 households, when it was in the former Baruq District of Miandoab County. The following census in 2011 counted 24 people in 7 households. The latest census in 2016 showed a population of 133 people in 45 households. After the census, Baruq District was separated from Miandoab County, elevated to the status of a county, and divided into two districts: the Central and Nokhtalu Districts.

References 

Populated places in West Azerbaijan Province